Andrew Lawrence Riker (1868–1930) was an early automobile designer known for helping the U.S. car industry to transition from electric to gas-powered car manufacturing. He began experimenting with electric vehicles in 1884. He formed the Riker Electric Motor Company in 1888 to make electric motors, and a year later formed the Riker Motor Vehicle Company in Elizabeth, New Jersey. (advertised as "Elizabethport".) The company was absorbed by the Electric Vehicle Company in 1901.

Riker was hired afterwards by Locomobile for their ICE development.

Riker was a Co-Founder of the Society of Automotive Engineers in 1905 and served as the first president for three years.

Wins 
 1896: Rhode Island State Fair (Providence, 7–11 sept.)
 1900: Springfield-Babylon-Springfield (14 apr.)

References

Further reading 
 James J. Flink. The Automobile Age. Cambridge: MIT Press, 1988.
 Smithsonian Institution: America On The Move: Riker electric automobile
 A.L. Riker Photos and articles about the early years of the Riker Electric Vehicles

American automobile designers
American engineers
19th-century American businesspeople
Artists from Elizabeth, New Jersey
1868 births
1930 deaths
Businesspeople from Elizabeth, New Jersey
Engineers from New Jersey

American automotive pioneers